Théâtre de Caen, 135 bd du Maréchal Leclerc, is the principle theatre and opera house of Caen, opened in 1963.

The old theatre

The original théâtre de Caen, was built in 1765 by Alexandre Brongniart, on the Rue de l'Ancienne-Comédie. 

A new theater was built on the bank of the Noë in 1838. This building was destroyed in 1944 during World War II. The current building is inaugurated in 1963.

References

External links
 http://theatre.caen.fr

Opera houses in France
Buildings and structures in Caen
Theatres in France